Darvian-e Sofla (also Romanized as Darvīān-e Soflá; also known as Darreh Vīān-e Khoshkeh, Darreh Vīān-e Khowshkeh, Darreh Vīān Khoshkeh, Darreh Wiyan Khushkeh, and Takāvasān) is a village in Khvor Khvoreh Rural District, Ziviyeh District, Saqqez County, Kurdistan Province, Iran. At the 2006 census, its population was 181, in 30 families. The village is populated by Kurds.

References 

Towns and villages in Saqqez County
Kurdish settlements in Kurdistan Province